{{Infobox television
| image                    = Pup-named-scooby-doo.jpg
| caption                  = Show title card
| genre                    = 
| based_on             = | developer                = Tom Ruegger
| director                 = 
| voices                   = 
| theme_music_composer     = John Debney
| opentheme                = "A Pup Named Scooby-Doo"
| composer                 = John Debney
| country                  = United States
| language                 = English
| network                  = ABC
| executive_producer       = 
| producer                 = 
| editor                   = 
| company                  = Hanna-Barbera Productions
| num_seasons              = 4
| num_episodes             = 27 (30 segments)
| list_episodes            = List of A Pup Named Scooby-Doo episodes
| runtime                  = 22 minutes approx.
| picture_format           = NTSC
| audio_format             = Stereo
| first_aired              = 
| last_aired               = 
| related                  = {{Plainlist|
 The 13 Ghosts of Scooby-Doo (1985)
 What's New, Scooby-Doo?' (2002–06)
}}
}}A Pup Named Scooby-Doo is an American animated mystery comedy series produced by Hanna-Barbera. It is the eighth incarnation of the studio's Scooby-Doo franchise and depicts younger versions of the title character and his human companions as they solve mysteries, similar to the original television series. The series was developed by Tom Ruegger and premiered on September 10, 1988, airing for four seasons on ABC as well as during the syndicated block The Funtastic World of Hanna-Barbera until August 17, 1991.

Along with most of Hanna-Barbera's production staff, Ruegger departed from the studio after the first season (to create Tiny Toon Adventures for Warner Bros. Animation) and Don Lusk, a longtime animator for the Disney and Bill Melendez animation studios, took over as director. A Pup Named Scooby-Doo is the final television series in the franchise in which Don Messick portrayed Scooby-Doo before his death in 1997 and one of the few in the franchise in which someone other than Frank Welker voiced the character of Fred Jones (child actor Carl Steven took on the role for this series; Welker voiced other bit roles in the series, including Fred's uncle Ed). Messick and Casey Kasem, the latter of whom voiced Shaggy Rogers, were the only two voice actors from other Scooby-Doo series to reprise their roles and both received starring credits for their work.

Episodes

Characters

Main
Scooby (voiced by Don Messick) – The main character of the series and the mascot of the Scooby-Doo Detective Agency. Messick also voiced several other characters in the show.
Shaggy Rogers (voiced by Casey Kasem) – Scooby-Doo's best friend. Kasem also voices Shaggy's Dad and additional voices.
Fred Jones (voiced by Carl Steven) – The scatterbrained leader of the Scooby-Doo Detective Agency.
Daphne Blake (voiced by Kellie Martin) – A wealthy child with a haughty and sarcastic personality and wears white go-go boots.
Velma Dinkley (voiced by Christina Lange) – An intelligent, but shy and soft-spoken girl.

Supporting
 Red Herring (voiced by Scott Menville) – The town bully who Freddie almost always wrongly accused of being the villain. Herring was the villain in only one episode, "Night of the Boogey Biker," but Freddie did not accuse him due to Daphne betting he couldn't go 24 hours without accusing Herring. He often torments the gang but is always thwarted. Among his catchphrases are "Hah! What a weenie!" "That's not very funny" and "I didn't do it, Jones!" His name is a reference to the idiom "red herring."
 Sugie (voiced by B. J. Ward) – Sugie is Shaggy's baby sister with her name being pronounced "shoogy." She only appeared in two episodes. She is Shaggy's favorite "non-puppy person" in the world. She has a baby bag which contains her favorite boulder, a crib, her string collection, a refrigerator containing her baby food among various other items. Sugie appeared in The New Scooby and Scrappy-Doo Show episode "Wedding Bell Boos" as the bride-to-be in 1983, using her given name of Maggie Rogers.
 Gus – Gus is the janitor of Coolsville Junior High. He is an inventor. It is shown that he also works at Coolsville Mall (and possibly for the Blakes). He has a fondness for Velma and will do anything to help her.
 O'Greasy (voiced by Charlie Adler) – O'Greasy is the owner of O'Greasy restaurants, a fast food chain which serves every meal in a bucket. O'Greasy once had competitor named Arnie Barney who used to serve his fast food in bags until O'Greasy blew his business out of the water. The gang helps him when a burger monster threatened to close his restaurants down.
 Carol Colossal – Carol Colossal is the owner of Colossal Toys and later the Coolsville Wrestling Federation (CWF). She also is the creator of Commander Cool. The gang helps her when her business and the Commander Cool toyline is in danger.
 Barbara Simone – Barbara Simone is Carol Colossal's secretary. She tried to destroy Colossal's business by stealing and selling blueprints for its Commander Cool toyline, but was foiled by the Scooby-Doo Detective Agency in "The Return of Commander Cool". She is so efficient as a secretary that Carol Colossal got her a license to leave prison to resume her work in "Wrestle Maniacs" where she appears wearing the traditional black-and-white stripped prison uniform and has an officer following her wherever she goes. With that, she became the only character (other than Red) to reappear in another episode after being unmasked.
 Jenkins (voiced by Don Messick) – Jenkins is Daphne's butler, whom she calls in to do various tasks. He responds whenever his name is called (He once showed up after thinking Velma said "Jenkins," when she really said "Jinkies"). The one time he didn't respond to Daphne's call, a butler named Dawson responded for him and told Daphne that Jenkins was busy doing her shopping, which she deemed an acceptable excuse. Dawson seems to be as efficient as Jenkins.

Production
The new format followed the trend of the "babyfication" of older cartoon characters, reducing the original Scooby-Doo, Where Are You! cast to elementary-aged kids (in doing so, the series reintroduced Fred Jones and Velma Dinkley to the show, both of whom had not appeared as regular characters since the 1970s, and removed Scrappy-Doo from the cast). This new show also used the same basic formula as the original 1969 show: the "Scooby-Doo Detective Agency" (a forerunner of Mystery Inc.) solved supernatural-based mysteries in the town of Coolsville, where the monsters of the week are always revealed as bad guys in masks and costumes. The difference was the tone of the show: with A Pup Named Scooby-Doo, producer Tom Ruegger built upon the slightly irreverent humor he had established along with producer Mitch Schauer with Scooby's previous unsuccessful incarnation, The 13 Ghosts of Scooby-Doo. This resulted in a wackier, more extremely comic version of Scooby-Doo that satirized the conventions of the show's previous incarnations. It was not uncommon for the characters to do wild Tex Avery/Bob Clampett-esque takes when they ran into ghosts and monsters. Animation director and overseas supervisor Glen Kennedy animated many of the wild-take sequences personally. Fred was constantly blaming a character appropriately called "Red Herring" (a pun on red herring) for each and every crime on the show (true to his name, Red was always innocent, except for "Night of the Boogey Biker," the one episode in which Fred didn't blame him) and shots of the characters (and even the monsters) dancing were inserted into the pop-rock-music-scored chase sequences. The monsters themselves were also more comedic, such as a creature made out of molten cheese, a monster in the form of a giant hamburger and the ghost of a dogcatcher. The series also features Scooby and Shaggy as their favorite superhero duo. Shaggy would be the fearless Commander Cool (a combination of Batman and Superman) and Scooby would be his faithful canine sidekick Mellow Mutt (a combination of Krypto, Robin and Ace the Bat-Hound). In 2013, a direct-to-video puppet film was released exclusively to U.S. Walmart stores and digital download called Scooby-Doo! Adventures: The Mystery Map, that used character designs from A Pup Named Scooby-Doo.Comparisons between character incarnations
 Shaggy was exactly like his older incarnation. He ate a lot and used the terms "Like" and "Zoinks!" constantly. He sometimes agrees with other members of the gang, considering the monster of the week.
 Scooby-Doo behaved like the older version of the character as well, with at least one exception:  when given a Scooby Snack, this incarnation of Scooby often would "mmmm!" or similar in an exaggerated manner, rocket into the air (sometimes literally), then float back down to the ground, similar to Snuffles' reaction after consuming a dog biscuit in Quick Draw McGraw.
 Daphne was a vain young girl who was quite skeptical and sarcastic (especially towards Fred). Being born into money, she often called to her butler, Jenkins (a pun on "Jinkies!"), for help (on occasion, Scooby would call for him instead, like in the episode "Horror of the Haunted Hairpiece"), usually for incredibly silly reasons ("be scared for me"), something she does not do while older, despite still being fabulously wealthy. She often accused the wrong person who did the crime, only by her intuition. She also had a deep infatuation with the color pink (opposing older Daphne, who prefers everything in purple), preferring most of her clothes and personal possessions in said color and treats fashion as life and death. She also hates getting her new boots dirty and absolutely refuses to believe in the supernatural (her catchphrase in the show is "There's no such things as {insert supernatural element here}.") despite the fact she and the rest of the gang actually met and befriended a ghost in one episode.
 Fred was an outspoken young boy who always jumps to the wrong conclusion. His runaway imagination often annoyed the rest of the gang (his favorite magazine is the National Exaggerator, which his uncle gains ownership of during the course of the series). Before accusing Red Herring for absolutely no reason (which happens in nearly every episode), he often offered a ludicrous hypothesis for the mystery in question, which usually involves anything from non-fiction. However, he can get the point at times.
 Velma was mostly the same as her older incarnation—intelligent and soft-spoken with thick eyeglasses. The most evident change to her character was that she owned a briefcase-sized mobile computer that could determine who the culprit was in any particular episode. Velma also owned an oversized engine-propelled skateboard with a color scheme similar to the Mystery Machine, which all the characters could ride on.  She had a distinctive gait during longer walks or runs (rapidly-shuffling feet), and a distinctive dance style borrowed from Peanuts character 5 (as he appears during the dance scene in A Charlie Brown Christmas).

The What's New, Scooby-Doo? episode "A Terrifying Round with a Menacing Metallic Clown" featured a flashback to Velma's fifth birthday, using the character designs from A Pup Named Scooby-Doo, albeit with some modifications, such as Daphne wearing purple rather than pink. Fred and Velma were the only returning characters to speak in the flashback, voiced by Welker and Mindy Cohn. The continuity of the live-action film Scooby-Doo! The Mystery Begins establishes the team meeting in their teens.

Music
Rock and roll-styled songs (specifically about the monster of the week) were played during the chase scene in each episode, similar to the second-season episodes of Scooby-Doo, Where are You! However, unlike previous versions of the show, the kids were often aware of the music being played (having turned it on themselves in many occasions) and would dance for a bit along with the ghosts and monsters before continuing with the chase (Glen Kennedy would often animate the characters' dance cycles himself). The show's theme song, featuring lyrics by series creator Tom Ruegger and music by composer John Debney, also bore a similarity to the "Intro Song" from Little Shop of Horrors, which had recently been adapted into a successful feature film. The music is almost always in a 1950s rock and roll style, possibly to indicate their younger age, as the original show took place in 1969.

Home media
Warner Home Video (via Hanna-Barbera and Warner Bros. Family Entertainment) initially released all 27 episodes of A Pup Named Scooby-Doo on DVD in Region 1 in seven volume sets. They subsequently re-released the entire series in different DVD sets. The first two seasons are available for download from the iTunes Store. "Wrestle Maniacs" can be found on the Scooby-Doo! WrestleMania Mystery'' DVD.

See also

References

External links
 

1980s American animated television series
1990s American animated television series
1988 American television series debuts
1991 American television series endings
1980s American mystery television series
1990s American mystery television series
American Broadcasting Company original programming
American children's animated adventure television series
American children's animated comedy television series
American children's animated fantasy television series
American children's animated horror television series
American children's animated mystery television series
American prequel television series
Animated television series about children
Child versions of cartoon characters
Scooby-Doo television series
Television series by Hanna-Barbera
Television series created by Tom Ruegger
The Funtastic World of Hanna-Barbera
English-language television shows